It Can't Happen Here is a 1935 dystopian political novel by American author Sinclair Lewis. It describes a United States dictator whose rise to power is similar to that of Adolf Hitler. The novel was adapted into a play by Lewis and John C. Moffitt in 1936.

Premise
The novel was published during the heyday of fascism in Europe, which was reported on by Dorothy Thompson, Lewis's wife. The novel describes the rise of Berzelius "Buzz" Windrip, a demagogue who is elected President of the United States, after fomenting fear and promising drastic economic and social reforms while promoting a return to patriotism and "traditional" values. After his election, Windrip takes complete control of the government via self-coup and imposes totalitarian rule with the help of a ruthless paramilitary force, in the manner of European fascists such as Adolf Hitler and Benito Mussolini. The novel's plot centers on journalist Doremus Jessup's opposition to the new regime and his subsequent struggle against it as part of a liberal rebellion.

Plot
In 1936, Senator Berzelius "Buzz" Windrip, a charismatic and power-hungry politician from an unnamed U.S. state, enters the presidential election campaign on a populist platform, promising to restore the country to prosperity and greatness, and promising each citizen $5,000 per year. Portraying himself as a champion of "the forgotten man" and "traditional" American values, Windrip defeats President Franklin D. Roosevelt, the Democratic nomination, and then easily beats his Republican opponent, Senator Walt Trowbridge, in the November election.

Having previously foreshadowed some authoritarian measures to reorganize the United States government, Windrip rapidly outlaws dissent, incarcerates political enemies in concentration camps, and trains and arms a paramilitary force called the "Minute Men" (named after the Revolutionary War militias of the same name), who terrorize citizens and enforce the policies of Windrip and his corporatist regime. One of Windrip's first acts as president is to eliminate the influence of the United States Congress, which draws the ire of many citizens as well as the legislators themselves. The Minute Men respond to protests against Windrip's decisions harshly, attacking demonstrators with bayonets. In addition to these actions, Windrip's administration, known as the Corpo government, curtails women's and minority rights, and eliminates individual states by subdividing the country into administrative sectors. The government of these sectors is managed by Corpo authorities, usually prominent businessmen or Minute Men officers. Those accused of crimes against the government appear before kangaroo courts presided over by military judges. A majority of Americans approve of these dictatorial measures, seeing them as painful but necessary steps to restore American power.  

Open opponents of Windrip, led by Senator Trowbridge, form an organization called the New Underground (named after the Underground Railroad), helping dissidents escape to Canada and distributing anti-Windrip propaganda. One recruit to the New Underground is Doremus Jessup, the novel's protagonist, a traditional liberal and an opponent of both corporatism and communism, the latter being suppressed by Windrip's administration. Jessup's participation in the organization results in the publication of a periodical called The Vermont Vigilance, in which he writes editorials decrying Windrip's abuses of power. (Even before Windrip's election, Jessup brings up the possibility of fascism coming to America, but Francis Tasbrough, the wealthy owner of a quarry in Jessup's hometown of Fort Beulah, Vermont, dismisses it with the remark that it simply "can't happen here", hence the novel's title.)

Shad Ledue, the local district commissioner and Jessup's former hired man, resents his old employer. Ledue eventually discovers Jessup's actions and has him sent to a concentration camp. Ledue subsequently terrorizes Jessup's family and particularly his daughter Sissy, who he unsuccessfully attempts to seduce. Sissy discovers evidence of corrupt dealings on the part of Ledue which she exposes to Francis Tasbrough, a one-time friend of Jessup and Ledue's superior in the administrative hierarchy. Tasbrough has Ledue imprisoned in the same camp as Jessup, where inmates Ledue had sent there organize Ledue's murder. After a relatively brief incarceration Jessup escapes when his friends bribe one of the camp guards. He flees to Canada where he rejoins the New Underground. He later serves the organization as a spy, passing along information and urging locals to resist Windrip.

In time, Windrip's hold on power weakens as the economic prosperity he promised fails to materialize, and increased numbers of disillusioned Americans, including Vice President Perley Beecroft, flee to both Canada and Mexico. Windrip also angers his Secretary of State, Lee Sarason, who had served earlier as his chief political operative and adviser. Sarason and Windrip's other lieutenants, including General Dewey Haik, seize power and exile the president to France. Sarason succeeds Windrip, but his extravagant and relatively weak rule creates a power vacuum in which Haik and others vie for power. In a bloody putsch, Haik leads a party of military supporters into the White House, kills Sarason and his associates, and proclaims himself president. The two coups cause a slow erosion of Corpo power and Haik's government desperately tries to arouse patriotism by launching an unjustified invasion of Mexico, slandering the country in state-run newspapers and ordering a mass conscription of young American men, infuriating many who had until then been staunch Corpo loyalists. Riots and rebellions break out across the country, with many realizing the Corpos have misled them.

General Emmanuel Coon, one of Haik's senior officers, defects to the opposition with a large portion of his army, giving strength to the resistance movement. Although Haik remains in control of much of the country, a new civil war soon breaks out as the resistance tries to consolidate its grasp on the Midwest. The novel ends after the beginning of the conflict, with Jessup working as an agent for the New Underground in Corpo-occupied portions of southern Minnesota.

Reception

Reviewers at the time, and historians and literary critics ever since, have emphasized the resemblance to Louisiana politician Huey Long, who used strong-arm political tactics and who was building a nationwide "Share Our Wealth" organization in preparing to run for president in the 1936 election. Long was assassinated in 1935 just prior to the novel's publication.

According to Boulard (1998), "the most chilling and uncanny treatment of Huey by a writer came with Sinclair Lewis's It Can't Happen Here." Lewis portrayed a genuine U.S. dictator on the Hitler model. Starting in 1936, the Works Progress Administration, a New Deal agency, performed the stage adaptation across the country; Lewis had the goal of hurting Long's chances in the 1936 election.

Keith Perry argues that the key weakness of the novel is not that he decks out U.S. politicians with sinister European touches, but that he finally conceives of fascism and totalitarianism in terms of traditional U.S. political models rather than seeing them as introducing a new kind of society and a new kind of regime. Windrip is less a Nazi than a con-man-plus-Rotarian, a manipulator who knows how to appeal to people's desperation, but neither he nor his followers are in the grip of the kind of world-transforming ideology like Hitler's Nazism.

Adaptations

Stage
In 1936, Lewis and John C. Moffitt wrote a stage version, also titled It Can't Happen Here, which is still produced. The stage version premiered on October 27, 1936, in 21 U.S. theaters in 17 states simultaneously, in productions sponsored by the Federal Theater Project.

The Z Collective, a San Francisco theater company, adapted the novel for the stage, producing it both in 1989 and 1992. In 2004, Z Space adapted the Collective's script into a radio drama that was broadcast on the Pacifica radio network on the anniversary of the Federal Theater Project's original premiere.

A new stage adaptation by Tony Taccone and Bennett S. Cohen premiered at the Berkeley Repertory Theatre in September 2016.

Unfinished film
Metro-Goldwyn-Mayer (MGM) purchased the rights in late 1935 for a reported $200,000 from seeing the galley proofs, with Lucien Hubbard (Wings) as the producer. By early 1936, screenwriter Sidney Howard completed an adaptation, his third of Lewis's novels. J. Walter Ruben was named to direct the film with the cast headed by Lionel Barrymore, Walter Connolly, Virginia Bruce, and Basil Rathbone. Studio head Louis B. Mayer indefinitely postponed production, citing costs, to the publicly announced pleasure of the Nazi regime in Germany. Lewis and Howard countered that financial reason with information pointing to Berlin's and Rome's influence on movies. Will H. Hays, responsible for the enforcement of the Motion Picture Production Code, had notified Mayer of potential problems in the German market. Joseph Breen, head of the Production Code Administration department under Hays, thought the script was too "anti-fascist" and "so filled with dangerous material".

In December 1938, Charlie Chaplin announced his next movie would satirize Hitler (The Great Dictator). MGM's Hubbard "dusted off the script" in January, but the "idea of a dictator ruling America" had now been discussed in public for years. Hubbard rewrote a new climax, "showing a dictatorship in Washington and showing it being kicked out by disgruntled Americans as soon as they realized what had happened." The film was placed back on the production schedule for the third time with shooting starting in June and Lewis Stone playing Doremus Jessup. By July 1939, MGM "admitted it would not make the movie after all" to some criticism.

Television
The 1968 television movie Shadow on the Land, which also went by the title United States: It Can't Happen Here, was produced by Screen Gems as a backdoor pilot for a series. The TV movie, a thriller which takes place following the fascist takeover, is often cited as an adaptation of Lewis's novel but does not credit the novel.

Inspired by the book, director–producer Kenneth Johnson in 1982 scripted a miniseries entitled Storm Warnings. NBC executives, to whom Johnson presented the script, rejected the original, which they considered too cerebral for the average American viewer. In order to make the script more marketable, Storm Warnings was revised into a far less subtle alien invasion  story in which the invaders initially pose as humanity's friends. The new script formed the basis for the popular miniseries V, which premiered May 3, 1983.

Legacy
Since its publication, It Can't Happen Here has been seen as a cautionary tale, starting with the 1936 presidential election and potential candidate Huey Long.

In retrospect, Franklin D. Roosevelt's internment of Japanese Americans during World War II has been used as an example of "It can happen here".

Frank Zappa and The Mothers of Invention released their first album Freak Out! in 1966 with the song "It Can't Happen Here".

In May 1973, in the middle of the Watergate scandal, Knight Newspapers published an ad in their own and other publications, headlined "It Can't Happen Here" and emphasizing the importance of free press: "There is a struggle going on in this country. It is not just a fight by reporters and editors to protect their sources. It is a fight to protect the public's right to know. [...] It can't happen here as long as the press remains an open conduit through which public information flows." Herbert Mitgang in his op-ed piece said "The headline of this ad is the title of a novel that keeps insinuating itself these days, not because of its literary qualities but because of its prescience." And that Lewis's point was "that home‐grown hypocrisy leads to a nice brand of home‐grown authoritarianism."

Joe Conason's non-fiction book It Can Happen Here: Authoritarian Peril in the Age of Bush (2007) frequently quotes Lewis's book in relation to the presidency of George W. Bush.

Presidency of Donald Trump
Several writers have compared the demagogue Buzz Windrip to Donald Trump. Michael Paulson wrote in The New York Times that the Berkeley Repertory Theatre's 2016 rendition of the play aimed to provoke discussion about Trump's presidential candidacy. Writing for The Guardian, Jules Stewart discussed the similarities between Trump's America with the country as depicted in the book. In Salon, Malcolm Harris stated: "Like Trump, Windrip uses a lack of tact as a way to distinguish himself" and "The social forces that Windrip and Trump invoke aren’t funny, they’re murderous." In The Washington Post, Carlos Lozada compared Trump to Windrip, opining that "it is impossible to miss the similarities between Trump and totalitarian figures in American literature." Jacob Weisberg wrote in Slate that one "can’t read Lewis' novel today without flashes of Trumpian recognition." Following the results of the 2016 United States presidential election, sales of It Can't Happen Here surged significantly, and it appeared on Amazon.com's list of bestselling books. Penguin Modern Classics released a new edition of the novel on January 20, 2017, the same day as the inauguration of Donald Trump.

In 2018, HarperCollins published Can It Happen Here?: Authoritarianism in America, a collection of essays about the prospect of authoritarianism in the United States, edited by Cass Sunstein.

In 2019, Robert Evans produced the podcast series It Could Happen Here, which speculated on the causes and consequences of a hypothetical second American Civil War.

In 2021, New York University Press published a book It Can Happen Here: White Power and the Rising Threat of Genocide in the US by genocide scholar Alexander Laban Hinton. Hinton argued that "there is a real risk of violent atrocities happening in the United States".

Similar works
Books
  Dystopian novel set in a near-future fundamentalist New England
  Dystopian science-fiction novel sometimes said to predict the rise of Donald Trump's presidency.
  Nonfiction book
 Dick, Philip K. (1962). The Man in the High Castle. A post World War II alternative history, where Nazi Germany and Imperial Japan are in control of America and the world.
  Book about a fascist Britain
  American dystopian novel
  British graphic novel about a terrorist overthrowing a post-apocalyptic fascist Britain
  Alternate history novel in which Charles Lindbergh defeats Roosevelt in 1940 and begins antisemitic and pro-German policies
  Collection of essays
 Walton, Jo (2006-08). The "Small Change" trilogy (Farthing, Ha'penny  and Half a Crown). An alternate history trilogy where a fascist government takes over Great Britain.

Films & Television
 It Happened Here (1964; also known as It Happened Here: The Story of Hitler's England), a black-and white film about a fictitious fascist government in Britain during World War II
 The Plot Against America, a 2020 alternate history drama television miniseries by David Simon and Ed Burns, based on the novel of the same name

References

Bibliography

Further reading
 
 
 
  Doctoral Dissertation.
   "Sinclair Lewis's 1935 novel 'It Can't Happen Here' envisioned an America in thrall to a homespun fascist dictator. Newly reissued, it's as unsettling a read as ever."

External links
 
 

1935 American novels
1935 science fiction novels
American novels adapted into films
American novels adapted into plays
American political novels
American satirical novels
Doubleday, Doran books
Dystopian novels
Huey Long
Novels about totalitarianism
Novels by Sinclair Lewis
Novels set in Vermont
Novels set in Washington, D.C.
Fiction set in 1936
Novels set in the 1930s
Second American Civil War speculative fiction